Boris (Boaz) Abramovich Trakhtenbrot (19 February 1921 – 19 September 2016) was a Russian-Israeli mathematician in logic, algorithms, theory of computation, and cybernetics.

Biography
Trakhtenbrot was born in Brichevo, northern Bessarabia (now Tîrnova, Moldova). He studied at the Moldovan State Pedagogical Institute in Kishinev, Chernivtsi University, and the Ukrainian Academy of Science's Mathematical Institute, completing a Ph.D. at the latter institution in 1950.

He worked at Akademgorodok, Novosibirsk during the 1960s and 1970s. In 1964 Trakhtenbrot discovered and proved a fundamental result in theoretical computer science called the gap theorem. He also discovered and proved the theorem in logic, model theory, and computability theory now known as Trakhtenbrot's theorem. 

After immigrating to Israel in 1981, he became a professor in the Faculty of Exact Sciences at Tel Aviv University, and continued as professor emeritus until his death. He died on 19 September 2016, at the age of 95.

Notes

External links 
 
 
 

1921 births
2016 deaths
Bessarabian Jews
Israeli computer scientists
Israeli Jews
20th-century Israeli mathematicians
Israeli people of Moldovan-Jewish descent
Moldovan computer scientists
Moldovan Jews
20th-century Moldovan mathematicians
People from Dondușeni District
Soviet computer scientists
Soviet emigrants to Israel
Soviet mathematicians
Academic staff of Tel Aviv University